Peyton Tyler Watson (born September 11, 2002) is an American professional basketball player for the Denver Nuggets of the National Basketball Association (NBA).  A McDonald's All-American in high school, he played one season of college basketball for the UCLA Bruins. Watson was selected in the first round of the 2022 NBA draft with the 30th overall pick.

High school career
Watson attended Long Beach Polytechnic High School in Long Beach, California, joining the varsity team as a freshman. After coming off the bench earlier in his career, he assumed a leading role in his junior season. He averaged 23.2 points and eight rebounds per game, earning Moore League MVP honors. He was named to the rosters for the McDonald's All-American, Jordan Brand Classic and Nike Hoop Summit.

Recruiting
Watson was a consensus five-star recruit, one of the top small forwards and the highest-ranked player from California in the 2021 recruiting class. On July 27, 2020, he committed to playing college basketball for UCLA over offers from Arizona, Gonzaga, Michigan, Oregon and Washington. He was frank with the Bruins coaching staff that he intended to be a one-and-done player, leaving for the NBA after one year in college.

College career
As a freshman at the University of California, Los Angeles in 2021–22, Watson arrived out of shape, primarily due to his high school senior season being disrupted by the COVID-19 pandemic. He joined an experienced UCLA group that had advanced to the Final Four of the NCAA tournament a year earlier. All five starters returned, and he received no guarantees about his playing time. Watson's defense was more advanced than his offense. However, the Bruins had other established scorers. He received honorable mention for the Pac-12 All-Freshman Team. He averaged 3.3 points and 2.9 rebounds in 12.6 minutes per game, and made just 32.2% of his field goals and 22.6% of his 3-pointers. His playing time was sporadic, and he logged 10 minutes or more in just two out of the last seven games of the season. After the season, Watson declared for the 2022 NBA draft, forgoing his remaining college eligibility.

Professional career
Watson was selected by the Oklahoma City Thunder in first round of the 2022 NBA draft with the 30th overall pick. He was then traded to the Denver Nuggets along with two future second-round picks for JaMychal Green and a 2027 protected first-round draft pick. Possessing a wide wingspan, Watson was projected as a long-term project and expected to spend time developing with the Grand Rapids Gold of the NBA G League.

National team career
Watson represented the United States at the 2021 FIBA Under-19 World Cup in Latvia. He averaged four points, 3.4 rebounds and 2.7 assists per game, helping his team win the gold medal.

Career statistics

College

|-
| style="text-align:left;"| 2021–22
| style="text-align:left;"| UCLA
| 32 || 0 || 12.7 || .322 || .226 || .688 || 2.9 || .8 || .6 || .6 || 3.3

Source:

Personal life
Watson's father, Julio, is a medical device representative, and his mother is an event planner. He has a younger brother, Christian, who plays basketball at Long Beach Polytechnic High School, and a younger sister, Jolie Grace.

References

External links

UCLA Bruins bio
USA Basketball bio

2002 births
Living people
American men's basketball players
Basketball players from Long Beach, California
Denver Nuggets players
Grand Rapids Gold players
McDonald's High School All-Americans
Oklahoma City Thunder draft picks
Shooting guards
Small forwards
UCLA Bruins men's basketball players